The Wheeler Crest or Wheeler Ridge is a ridge in Mono and Inyo Counties, California. The ridge is bound on the west by Rock Creek, on the north by the community of Toms Place, on the east by Round Valley, on the southeast by Gable Creek, and on the southwest by Morgan Creek.

References

Landforms of Inyo County, California
Landforms of Mono County, California
Ridges of California
Landforms of the Sierra Nevada (United States)